The von Trapp Family: A Life of Music (German: Die Trapp Familie - Ein Leben für die Musik) is a 2015 German-Austrian musical drama film based on the lives of the Austrian singing Trapp Family directed by Ben Verbong and starring Rosemary Harris, Matthew Macfadyen, Eliza Bennett, Lauryn Canny, and Yvonne Catterfeld. It is an English-language adaptation of Agathe von Trapp's 2003 book Agathe von Trapp: Memories Before and After The Sound of Music.

Cast
 Rosemary Harris as older Agathe von Trapp
 Eliza Bennett as young Agathe
 Lisa-Maria Trinkl as little Agathe
 Matthew Macfadyen as Georg von Trapp
 Lauryn Canny as Kirsty
 Yvonne Catterfeld as Maria von Trapp
 Johannes Nussbaum as Sigi
 Elias Karl as Little Sigi
 Cornelius Obonya as Konrad
 Annette Dasch as Lotte Lehmann
 Barbara M. Messner as Mathilde
 Brigitte Kren as Frau Mayer
 Marco Dott as Attorney Müller
 Finnian Hipper as Rupert von Trapp
 Luca Russegger as Little Rupert
 Christopher Hipper as Werner von Trapp
 Emanuel Promberger as Little Werner
 Laura Lapuch as Hedwig von Trapp
 Alisa Rotthaler as Little Hedwig
 Anika Baumgartlinger as Martina von Trapp
 Helen Winter as Little Martina
 Kitty Kratzer as Johanna von Trapp
 Franziska Lehfeldt as Little Johanna
 Isabella Holyst as Maria Franziska von Trapp
 Luna Cengu as Little Maria
 Lara Weilharter as Rosmarie Erentrudis von Trapp
 Emma Schwamberger as Little Rosmarie Erentrudis von Trapp
 Philippa Mayr-Melnhof as Eleonore von Trapp
 Miriam Plasse as Little Eleonore
 Robert Seeliger as Marcus von Trapp
 Cosima Shaw as Carrie von Trapp

External links
 

2015 films
2010s musical drama films
German musical drama films
Austrian musical drama films
English-language German films
Films about music and musicians
Films about families
Films about Nazi Germany
Films set in 1937
Films set in 1938
Films set in 1939
Films set in the 2010s
Films set in Austria
Films set in Salzburg
Films set in Vermont
Films shot in Bavaria
Films shot in Austria
Films shot in Montana
Constantin Film films
2015 drama films
Trapp family
2010s English-language films
Films directed by Ben Verbong
2010s German films